Mystus leucophasis is an Asian species of upside-down catfish belonging to the family Bagridae. It is known for its unusual behaviour, as it primarily swims in an inverted position  and never upright.

Mystus Leucophasis originate in the Sittang and other rivers of Myanmar. They are commercially fished for human consumption as well as being found in the aquarium trade. When kept in the aquarium they cannot be kept with smaller "community" fish as they will eat them.

References
 

J. Asiatic Soc. Bengalv. 29 (no. 2) - pp148

Bagridae
Fish of South Asia
Fish described in 1860
Taxa named by Edward Blyth